The Maryland Senate is the upper house of the Maryland General Assembly, the state legislature of the U.S. State of Maryland. One Senator is elected from each of the state's 47 electoral districts. As of January 2023, 34 of those seats are held by Democrats and 13 by Republicans. The leader of the Senate is known as the President, a position currently held by Bill Ferguson, who represents Baltimore City. In addition, senators elect a President Pro Tempore, and the respective party caucuses elect a majority and minority leader and a majority and minority whip.

Senators are elected in even-numbered years when the President of the United States is not being elected, similar to most other state offices in Maryland. The most recent election was in November 2018. Senators are not term-limited. Should a Senator resign from office before his or her term expires, the local central committee of the party to which the retiring senator belonged makes a recommendation to the Governor for whom to appoint to the open seat. It is tradition for the Governor to appoint the recommended person. Nine of the current members of the Maryland State Senate were originally appointed, all of whom have since been elected in their own right. Newly elected senators are sworn in and begin work on the second Wednesday of the January following their election.

Each Senator has at least one standing committee assignment. The first is to one of the four legislative committees: Budget and Taxation; Education, Health, and Environmental Affairs (listed in this table as Education, Health, and Environment); Finance; or Judicial Proceedings. A number of senators have secondary committee assignments, most prominently to the Executive Nominations Committee, which oversees the constitutional responsibility of the Senate to approve nominations by the Governor. Assignment to the Rules or Executive Nominations committees or to any Ad Hoc committees is not noted.

Current party composition
Composition as of the beginning of the 2019–2022 term on January 9, 2019:

During the 2015–2018 term, the State Senate was made up of 33 Democrats and 14 Republicans. Republicans gained two seats (District 38 in Worcester, Wicomico and Somerset counties and District 42 in Baltimore County), while losing one seat (District 9 in Howard and Carroll counties) in the elections held on November 6, 2018. Democrats maintain a super-majority in the chamber. Article II, Section 17(a) of the Maryland Constitution specifies it takes a three-fifths vote of both chambers to override a veto, which is 29 votes in the State Senate. The rules of the Senate also permit members to limit debate by a three-fifths majority vote, meaning Republicans would need to gain four additional seats, for a total of 19, in order to sustain a veto or filibuster legislation.

Current leadership
The below table reflects the current leadership of the Maryland State Senate as of October 4, 2021.

Current state senators

Notes
 This Senator was originally appointed to office by the Governor to fill an open seat.

 The President of the Senate does not serve on any of the four standing legislative committees. He does, however, serve on both the Executive Nominations and the Rules Committees.

See also
 List of current members of the Maryland House of Delegates

References
General
 
 

Specific

External links
 Maryland General Assembly

Maryland General Assembly
Senate
Maryland